The Pomoan, or Pomo , languages are a small family of seven languages indigenous to northern California spoken by the Pomo people, whose ancestors lived in the valley of the Russian River and the Clear Lake basin. Four languages are extinct, and all surviving languages except Kashaya have fewer than ten speakers.

Geographical distribution

John Wesley Powell, who was the first to define the extent of the family, noted that its boundaries were the Pacific Ocean to the west, Wintuan territory in the Sacramento Valley to the east, the head of the Russian River to the north, and Bodega Head and present-day Santa Rosa to the south (Powell 1891:87-88). Only Northeastern Pomo was not contiguous with the other Pomoan languages, being separated by an intervening region of Wintuan speakers.

Internal relationships of languages

Pomoan is a family of seven languages. Their relationship to one another was first formally recognized by John Wesley Powell, who proposed that they be called the "Kulanapan Family" (Powell 1891). Like many of Powell's obscure nomenclatural proposals, particularly for California languages, "Kulanapan" was ignored. In its place, Pomo, the term used by Indians and Whites alike for Northern Pomo, was arbitrarily extended to include the rest of the family. 

All seven languages were first systematically identified as Pomo by Samuel Barrett (1908). To avoid complications, Barrett named each of the Pomoan languages according to its geographic position ("Northern Pomo," "Southeastern Pomo," etc.) This naming convention quickly gained wide acceptance and is still in general use, except for the substitution of "Kashaya" for Barrett's "Southwestern Pomo". Barrett's geographical language names often lead those unfamiliar with the Pomoan languages to the misconception that they are dialects of a single "Pomo" language.

Various genetic subgroupings of the family have been proposed, although the general outlines have remained fairly consistent. The current consensus view (cf. Mithun 1999) favors the tree presented in Oswalt (1964), shown below.

 Southeastern Pomo
 Eastern Pomo †
 Northeastern Pomo †
 Western
 Northern Pomo †
 Southern
 Central Pomo †
 Southern Pomo †
 Kashaya (Southwestern Pomo)

Essentially identical versions of this classifications are presented in Oswalt and McLendon's "Introduction" to the Pomo chapters in Heizer, ed. (1978) and in Campbell (1997). The most important dissenter was Abraham M. Halpern, one of the few linguists since Barrett's time to collect comparative data on all of the Pomoan languages. 

Halpern's classification differed from Oswalt's mainly in the placement of Northeastern Pomo. Instead of considering it an independent branch of the family, Halpern grouped it with the languages of Oswalt's "Western" branch. He suggested the possibility that Northeastern Pomo represents a recent migration of a Northern Pomo subgroup (Halpern 1964; Golla 2011:106-7).

Proto-language

Proto-Pomo reconstructions by McLendon (1973):

{| class="wikitable sortable"
! gloss !! Proto-Pomo
|-
| acorn || *biʔdú
|-
| afraid, to be || *kʰiˑyá, *kʰiyáˑ
|-
| angelica || *baʔk̓ówa
|-
| arm || *ʔiˑxál(ʸ)
|-
| armpit || *daˑyamá-
|-
| arrow || *hic̓úˑ
|-
| arrow || *baṭʰíy
|-
| ashes || *hiˑnó(x̣ò)
|-
| back || *bak̓oˑ
|-
| backbone || *hiʔk̓i, *k̓idí
|-
| bark (of tree) || *qʰahwálʸ
|-
| basket, sp. || *c̓óˑy
|-
| basket, sp. || *kʰiṭúˑ
|-
| basket, pack (open-woven) || *buhqʰál
|-
| basket, pack (close-woven) || *buhkí ?
|-
| basket, pounding || *miké
|-
| bear || *buˑṭáqa(lʸ)
|-
| bear, brown || *limá(ˑ) ?
|-
| bee || *koʔó(lʸ), *kaʔolʸó
|-
| behind, rear || *siˑlí, *silíˑ
|-
| belly || *ʔuhqʰá(ˑ)
|-
| below || *ʔiyów
|-
| big, sg. || *bahṭʰé, *bahṭʰén
|-
| big, pl. || *ʔahṭʰíy, *ʔahṭíynʸ
|-
| bird || *c̓iyíta ~ *c̓ihtá
|-
| bite, to || *qaˑné-
|-
| blackfish || *xaqʰál
|-
| blanket || *ʔihxí(ˑ)
|-
| blood || *baˑláy
|-
| body || *xiʔbá
|-
| bone || *ʔihyá(ˑ)
|-
| bow || *xihmúy, *xi(ʔ)mi
|-
| brains, head, protuberance || *hoʔt̓ó
|-
| bread, acorn || *qʰaṭó(ˑ)
|-
| break wind || *ʔihpʰéṭ-
|-
| breast, milk || *xiʔdónʸ
|-
| brother, mother's || *cúˑ-c̓i ~ *céˑ-c̓i
|-
| brother, older || *méqi
|-
| brother, father's younger || *kéqi
|-
| brother-in-law (i.e., wife's brother ?) || *mahá-, *háˑ
|-
| buckeye || *bahxá
|-
| buckeye nuts when soaked || *dihsá
|-
| bumblebee || *kʰeˑhéy
|-
| burn || *maˑlí- ~ *mahlá-
|-
| bush, sp. || *qȧ(h)nóˑ
|-
| buzzard || *kuhkʰí
|-
| carry in hands, to || *bi-ʔdíˑ-d(i)-
|-
| causative || *-hqa
|-
| chaparral || *seʔé
|-
| chest || *yeʔélʸ
|-
| child || *qaˑwí
|-
| clam || *x̣alá/ú
|-
| claw || *héˑc̓
|-
| cloud || *qʰaʔbá(ˑ), *qʰaʔbú
|-
| clover || *ʔohsó
|-
| cold || *qahcíl, *qacˑi
|-
| come, to || *(h)wáˑdu-
|-
| cook, bake under ashes, to || *ʔihpʰá-
|-
| cottontail (rabbit) || *nóˑmik
|-
| cottonwood || *qaxálabʔ ~ *qáxalabʔ
|-
| coyote || *doˑwí
|-
| creek || *biʔdá
|-
| dance/song || *qʰé
|-
| daughter-in-law || *-ʔódʔ
|-
| daughter-in-law || *xowmi(ˑ-c̓i)
|-
| dawn, morning || *qʰaʔˑá
|-
| day || *makílʸ, *maˑkí
|-
| deer/meat || *bihxé
|-
| die, to || *q̓alálʸ ~ *q̓alá-
|-
| directional || *-lal
|-
| dirty || *c̓áʔc̓a
|-
| doe || *maṭʰéy
|-
| door || *hohwá
|-
| dove || *maˑyú, *maˑyúˑ
|-
| dream, to || *qʰaʔadˑú-
|-
| drink, to || *hoʔq̓ó(k)
|-
| duck || *q̓aˑyán (~ *q̓ayáˑn ?)
|-
| durative || *-kid-
|-
| ear || *xiˑmánʸ
|-
| earth || *ʔa(h)máṭ
|-
| east || *ʔaxóˑ
|-
| eat, chew, to || *qawá-
|-
| eat, to || *kuhˑú-
|-
| egg || *hik̓óˑ, *hik̓ó
|-
| elbow || *q̓o/uhsá
|-
| embers, charcoal || *mahsíkʔ/tʔ
|-
| enemy || *kuhmá
|-
| excrement || *ʔahpʰá
|-
| eye, face || *huʔúy
|-
| fat || *ʔihpʰúy
|-
| father || *meʔˑé
|-
| father, father's || *bá-ˑc̓i
|-
| father, mother's || *-ká-ˑc̓i
|-
| fawn || *nuhwákʔ
|-
| feather, small/down || *ʔahṭʰé ~ *ʔahṭʰén ?
|-
| feather, large || *hiʔˑí
|-
| fire || *ʔohx̣ó
|-
| first person singular subject || *haʔáˑ
|-
| first person singular object || *ʔawí-toˑ
|-
| first person singular possessive prefix || *ʔawí-
|-
| first personal plural subject || *awá-ya
|-
| first personal plural object || *ʔawá-ya-l
|-
| fish || *ʔahxá
|-
| five || *ṭuhxo
|-
| flea || *ʔiˑméla
|-
| flesh || *c̓iʔˑí
|-
| flint || *qʰahká
|-
| fly, to (1) || *hakˑá- ( ?)
|-
| fly, to (2) || *pʰudí-
|-
| fly, n. || *c̓amolʸ
|-
| food || *maʔá
|-
| foot || *qʰaˑmánʸ
|-
| forehead || *diˑlé
|-
| forest, deep, dense (hence shaded) || *xiˑyó
|-
| fox (1) || *haq̓áw
|-
| fox (2) || *duˑcá
|-
| frog || *waˑṭakʔ/qʔ
|-
| give round object || *dihqá-
|-
| go, several to || *pʰilá
|-
| good || *q̓oʔdí
|-
| goose || *lála, *hláˑla
|-
| gopher ? || *ʔaˑláme
|-
| grain, grain plant || *muhká
|-
| grass || *qac̓ˑá
|-
| grasshopper || *xahqót
|-
| hair, of head || *heʔˑé, *heʔey( ?)
|-
| hair, of body, fur || *cihmé ~ *ciˑme
|-
| hand || *ʔatʰáˑna ~ *ʔatʰaná
|-
| hawk || *k̓iyáˑ
|-
| head || *kináˑlʸ, *xináˑ/lʸ, *kʰináˑ ?
|-
| hear, to || *xóˑki-
|-
| hemp || *mahxá
|-
| hole || *hiˑmó
|-
| horn || *haʔˑá
|-
| hot, to be || *muht̓ám-
|-
| house || *ʔahká
|-
| hunt, to || *boˑʔó
|-
| imperative singular || *-im
|-
| jackrabbit || *ʔaˑmáˑqala
|-
| jay || *c̓ayi ~ *c̓aˑyi
|-
| jealous || *ʔayél
|-
| kinsman, one's own, in generations above ego || *-ˑc̓i
|-
| laugh, to || *kʰuwáy
|-
| leach, to || *kʰeʔé-
|-
| leaf (1) || *siʔṭ̓ál
|-
| leaf (2) || *xihpʰa
|-
| mountain || *dȧˑnó
|-
| mouth || *ʔahx̣á
|-
| mud || *báˑto
|-
| mudhen (?) || *qʰá-c̓iyàt ~ *qʰa-c̓it
|-
| mush, acorn || *ṭʰoʔó(ˑ)
|-
| mushroom (1) || *hic̓éˑ
|-
| mushroom (2) || *k̓aˑlál
|-
| mussel (ocean clam ?) || *lȧʔq̓ó
|-
| name || *ʔahxí
|-
| navel || *ʔohqó-hmo
|-
| neck || *q̓óyu
|-
| negative (1) || *-tʰin ?
|-
| negative (2) || *kʰów ~ *akʰˑów
|-
| dip net || *waˑyákʔ/qʔ
|-
| new || *xiˑwéy
|-
| night || *duwˑé
|-
| north || *kuhˑúla ( ?)
|-
| nose || *hiˑlá
|-
| oak, black || *yuhxíy, *lixúy
|-
| oak, live (?) || *maʔk̓i(bʔ)
|-
| oak, mush || *c̓ipʰa, *c̓apʰˑa
|-
| oak, sp. || *wiyú
|-
| oak, white || *qaʔban/l-
|-
| object case || *-al ~ *-to
|-
| occiput || *kʰaˑyá
|-
| on, on top of, above || *wína ~ *wináˑ
|-
| one || *k̓á-, *káˑ-
|-
| onion, wild || *qʰaʔbat/y
|-
| optative || *-ix
|-
| pain || *duṭʰál
|-
| panther || *yahmóṭʔ
|-
| path || *hiʔdá
|-
| people, group of people, village, race || *nȧhpʰó
|-
| pepperwood tree || *bahˑébʔ
|-
| pepperwoodnut || *bahˑé
|-
| phlegm || *q̓uʔlés
|-
| pick up a non-long object, to || *dihkí
|-
| pinole || *yuhhú(ˑ), *yuhx̣ú(ˑ) ?, *yuhhúy, *yuhx̣úyʔ
|-
| pitch || *qʰahwé, *qʰahwé
|-
| plural act (1) || *-lV-
|-
| plural act (2) (with extent?) || *-ma
|-
| plural number || *-aya
|-
| poison, poisoning song || *q̓oˑʔó ~ *q̓oʔóˑ
|-
| poison oak || *hmaˑṭi̇́yu ~ *maˑṭi̇́yuho ?
|-
| potato, Indian || *hiʔbúnʸ
|-
| pregnant || *wiˑní
|-
| quail || *xaqáˑqa
|-
| quail topknot || *qʰéya ~ *ʔehqʰéya
|-
| raccoon || *qʰaʔdús ~ *qʰahlús ?
|-
| rain || *kehkʰé(ˑ) ~ *ihkʰé
|-
| raw/alive || *qa(h)xó-
|-
| reciprocal || *~(h)ma(ˑ)k̓ ~ *-ma(ˑ)k̓-
|-
| reciprocal relationship || *-a(ˑ)q
|-
| rectum || *haṭ̓á, *(ṭ̓i ?)
|-
| reed, sp. || *c̓iwíx
|-
| reflexive || *-i(ˑ)k̓i
|-
| rib || *misˑá(ˑ)kʔ
|-
| ridge/mountain || *wixálʸ
|-
| rock || *qʰaʔbé
|-
| salt (1) || *ṭaʔq̓o
|-
| salt (2) || *kʰeʔéˑ
|-
| sand/gravel || *miˑṭákʔ
|-
| saw apart, to || *xuqʰáˑ-
|-
| seaweed, edible || *ʔoˑṭóno
|-
| second person singular subject || *ʔaˑmá
|-
| second person singular object || *míˑ-to ~ *mí-to ~ *mi-tó
|-
| second person singular possessive prefix || *mi-
|-
| second person plural subject || *ʔaˑmá-ya
|-
| second person plural object || *ʔaˑmá-ya-l
|-
| see || *kád-, *káˑd-
|-
| seed || * ?isóˑ, *ʔisóy
|-
| semelfactive || *-ki-
|-
| sentence connective (1) || *-pʰila
|-
| sentence connective (2) || *-pʰi
|-
| sentence connective (3) || *-in
|-
| separate from someone, to || *q̓á(ˑ), *q̓a-(m-)(h)mak̓
|-
| shoulder || *c̓uwáˑ
|-
| sibling, younger || *ṭ̓áqi
|-
| sinew || *hiˑmá
|-
| sister, father's || *múc̓i ~ *múˑc̓i ~ *wéˑqi
|-
| sister, mother's older || *ṭʰúˑc̓
|-
| sister, mother's younger || *xéˑqi
|-
| sister, older || *déˑqi
|-
| sister's husband || *kóˑdʔ, *qóˑdʔ ?
|-
| sit, to || *ká-
|-
| sit down, to || *kahkí-
|-
| six || *lanká, *káci
|-
| skin || *ćʔdá
|-
| skunk || *nupʰéṭ
|-
| sky || *qalí, *qalínʸ
|-
| sleep, to || *siˑmán
|-
| slow || *pʰaláˑ
|-
| slug || *paʔláˑ
|-
| smoke || *ʔohx̣ósa(xà), *saxá
|-
| snot || *hiˑlásu
|-
| snow || *ʔihyúlʸ
|-
| soaproot || *haʔˑá(ˑ)bʔ
|-
| son-in-law || *hkéye
|-
| sour || *móc̓ ~ *móˑc̓
|-
| south || *ʔiyó
|-
| speculative || *-xe-
|-
| spider || *ʔikʰáˑ, *mikʰá, *ikʰá
|-
| spit || *ʔihqʰetʔ
|-
| spleen || *maṭ́éˑ
|-
| spring (of water) || *(qʰa) qahpʰá
|-
| squirrel || *kuˑmáṭʔ, *qumáṭ
|-
| stink, to || *mihxé
|-
| stop doing, to || *-hyéˑ-
|-
| stories, myths, to tell || *maṭúˑ
|-
| string || *suˑlímaṭʔ
|-
| suckerfish || *xamólʸ
|-
| sun || *haʔdá
|-
| sweat || *mikʰˑéq
|-
| tail || *hibá
|-
| talk, to || *kȧhnów
|-
| tears || *huʔuy-qʰà(ˑ)
|-
| testicles || *yȧqolʸ
|-
| thing || *á(ˑ)maˑ
|-
| third person masculine singular subject || *hamíyabʔ
|-
| third person masculine singular object || *hamíˑb-al
|-
| third person feminine singular subject || *hamíyadʔ
|-
| third person feminine singular object || *hamíˑd-al
|-
| third person singular possessive prefix || *hamíyaˑ-
|-
| throat || *mihyánʸ
|-
| tick || *aṭ̓aʔláˑ
|-
| tongue || *haʔbálʸ ~ *hawba(ˑ) ~ *hibʔa
|-
| tooth || *hȧʔˑo
|-
| tree || *qʰaˑlé
|-
| tule, round || *bakóˑ
|-
| tule sprout || *ṭʰiʔbéˑ
|-
| two || *ʔaqʰóc
|-
| umbilicus || *ʔohqó
|-
| uphill || *dȧnóˑ
|-
| valley, clearing || *qahqó
|-
| walk, to || *hwáˑd-, *wáˑd-
|-
| water || *ʔahqʰá
|-
| west (1) || *mihila, *mix̣ila
|-
| west (2) || *bóˑ
|-
| what || *(baˑ)q́o(ˑ)
|-
| whistle || *li(?)búˑ
|-
| white || *qahlé
|-
| wildcat || *dȧˑlóm(ʔ)
|-
| wind || *ʔihyá
|-
| winter || *qʰu(ʔ)c̓áˑ-
|-
| wolf || *cihméwa ~ *ciméwa
|-
| woman || *ʔimáˑta
|-
| wood || *ʔahx̣áy
|-
| wood duck || *waṭá-
|-
| wood rat || *mihyóqʔ
|-
| worm (1) || *biˑlá
|-
| worm (2) || *ʔikʰólʸ
|}

See also
 Boontling – a constructed dialect of English incorporating Pomo words

 Central, Northern and Southern Pomo Language Apps are available in the App Store. Southern Pomo currently has 2 apps available. One called Learn Southern Pomo - alphabet and one called Southern Pomo Language - Intro.

Notes

References

 Barrett, Samuel A. (1908). The Ethno-Geography of the Pomo and Neighboring Indians. University of California Publications in American Archaeology and Ethnology, 6. 
 Campbell, Lyle. (1997). American Indian languages: The historical linguistics of Native America. New York: Oxford University Press. .
 Goddard, Ives (Ed.). (1996). Languages. Handbook of North American Indians (W. C. Sturtevant, General Ed.) (Vol. 17). Washington, D. C.: Smithsonian Institution. .
 Golla, Victor. (2011). California Indian Languages. Berkeley: University of California Press. .
 McLendon, Sally & Robert L. Oswalt (1978). "Pomo: Introduction". In California, ed. Robert F. Heizer. Vol. 8 of Handbook of North American Indians, ed. William C. Sturtevant, pp. 274–88. Washington, D.C.: Smithsonian Institution. .
 Mithun, Marianne. (1999). The languages of Native North America. Cambridge: Cambridge University Press.  (hbk); .
 Powell, John Wesley. (1891). Indian Linguistic Families Of America, North Of Mexico.  Annual Report of the Bureau of American Ethnology 7:1-142. Washington, DC: Government Printing Office.

External links

 Pomo (Yakaya, Yokaia, Shanel, Kábinapek) (Native Languages of the Americas)
 Kashaya (Kashia, Southwestern Pomo) (Native Languages of the Americas)
 Pomo/Kashaya Bibliography
 Pomo People: Brief History
 

 
Language families
Indigenous languages of California
Endangered indigenous languages of the Americas
Pomo tribe